Agboola Babalola Taye (born August 7, 1991), known as Taye Babalola, is a Nigerian professional football player currently playing for Israeli National League club Maccabi Ahi Nazareth as a defender.

Career
In 2009, Taye Babalola joined Israeli second division club, Ironi Rishon leZion. For the 2010/2011 season he signed with another Israeli second division club, Ahva Arraba, where he made 32 appearances.

In August 2011, Babalola signed with Israeli Premier League club, Maccabi Tel Aviv.

In August 2014, Babalola signed with Ironi Tiberias.

References

1991 births
Living people
Nigerian footballers
Association football defenders
Liga Leumit players
Hapoel Rishon LeZion F.C. players
Ahva Arraba F.C. players
Maccabi Be'er Sheva F.C. players
Hapoel Nof HaGalil F.C. players
Maccabi Ahi Nazareth F.C. players
Ironi Tiberias F.C. players
Expatriate footballers in Israel
Nigerian expatriate sportspeople in Israel
People from Owerri
Sportspeople from Imo State